Home Troopers (Traditional Chinese: 居家兵團) is a 2010–11 Hong Kong television serial drama produced by TVB. The series follow the lives of the middle class Chukot family, who helps organize a housekeeping business in Hong Kong.

Characters

Chukot family

Master Home Services Company

Other characters

See also
 Home Troopers

Home Troopers
Home Troopers